In astronomy, cataclysmic variable stars (CVs) are stars which irregularly increase in brightness by a large factor, then drop back down to a quiescent state. They were initially called novae, since ones with an outburst brightness visible to the naked eye and an invisible quiescent brightness appeared as new stars in the sky.

Cataclysmic variable stars are binary stars that consist of two components; a white dwarf primary, and a mass transferring secondary. The stars are so close to each other that the gravity of the white dwarf distorts the secondary, and the white dwarf accretes matter from the companion. The tightest currently observed orbit in a hydrogen-rich system is 51 minutes in ZTF J1813+4251. Therefore, the secondary is often referred to as the donor star. The infalling matter, which is usually rich in hydrogen, forms in most cases an accretion disk around the white dwarf. Strong UV and X-ray emission is often detected from the accretion disc, powered by the loss of gravitational potential energy from the infalling material.

Material at the inner edge of disc falls onto the surface of the white dwarf primary. A classical nova outburst occurs when the density and temperature at the bottom of the accumulated hydrogen layer rise high enough to ignite runaway hydrogen fusion reactions, which rapidly convert the hydrogen layer to helium. If the accretion process continues long enough to bring the white dwarf close to the Chandrasekhar limit, the increasing interior density may ignite runaway carbon fusion and trigger a Type Ia supernova explosion, which would completely destroy the white dwarf.

The accretion disc may be prone to an instability leading to dwarf nova outbursts, when the outer portion of the disc changes from a cool, dull mode to a hotter, brighter mode for a time, before reverting to the cool mode. Dwarf novae can recur on a timescale of days to decades.

Classification 
Cataclysmic variables are subdivided into several smaller groups, often named after a bright prototype star characteristic of the class. In some cases the magnetic field of the white dwarf is strong enough to disrupt the inner accretion disk or even prevent disk formation altogether. Magnetic systems often show strong and variable polarization in their optical light, and are therefore sometimes called polars; these often exhibit small-amplitude brightness fluctuations at what is presumed to be the white dwarf's period of rotation.

There are over 1600 known CV systems. The catalog was frozen as of 1 February 2006 though more are discovered each year.

Discovery

Cataclysmic variables are among the classes of astronomical objects most commonly found by amateurs, since a cataclysmic variable in its outburst phase is bright enough to be detectable with very modest instruments, and the only celestial objects easily confused with them are bright asteroids whose movement from night to night is clear.

Verifying that an object is a cataclysmic variable is also fairly straightforward: they are usually quite blue objects, they exhibit rapid and strong variability, and they tend to have peculiar emission lines. They emit in the ultraviolet and X-ray ranges; they are expected also to emit gamma rays, from annihilation of positrons from proton-rich nuclei produced in the fusion explosion, but this has not yet been detected.

Around six galactic novae (i.e. in our own galaxy) are discovered each year, whilst models based on observations in other galaxies suggest that the rate of occurrence ought to be between 20 and 50; this discrepancy is due partly to obscuration by interstellar dust, and partly to a lack of observers in the southern hemisphere and to the difficulties of observing while the Sun is up and at full moon.

Superhumps

Some cataclysmic variables experience periodic brightenings caused by deformations of the accretion disk when its rotation is in resonance with the orbital period of the binary.

References

External links 
A Catalog and Atlas of Cataclysmic Variables (Archival Edition)

Catalogue of Cataclysmic Binaries, Low-Mass X-Ray Binaries and Related Objects (RKcat Edition 7.24, 31 Dec 2015 – The Final Edition)
CVnet, a website and community for CV enthusiasts and researchers – features announcements of new discoveries
A Beginner's Guide to Cataclysmic Variables – features a very good categorisation of the different classes of stars
Cataclysmic Variables, NASA's High Energy Astrophysics Science Archive Research Center (HEASARC) page

 
Semidetached binaries
Stellar phenomena